Chen Qiaoling (Chinese: 陈巧铃, born November 22, 1999) is a Chinese pole vaulter. She won gold medals at the 2016 Asian Junior Championships and 2017 Asian Championships.

References

Chinese female pole vaulters
1999 births
Living people